Glyn Lingard (birth registered January 1, 1969) is an English former professional rugby league footballer who played in the 1990s. He played at club level for Doncaster (Heritage № 657), and Featherstone Rovers (Heritage № 727).

Playing career
Glyn Lingard made his début for Featherstone Rovers on Wednesday 23 August 1995, and he played his last match for Featherstone Rovers during the 1995–96 season.

Note
Glyn Lingard's forename is occasionally spelled incorrectly with two n's as Glynn.

References

1969 births
Living people
Doncaster R.L.F.C. players
English rugby league players
Featherstone Rovers players
Rugby league players from Wakefield